Somewhere Over the Rainbow is the 26th studio album by country music singer Willie Nelson, released in 1981. It features 1940s pop standards arranged by Nelson. The album's acoustic jazz instrumentation was also meant to play tribute to one of his heroes, Belgian gipsy jazz guitar virtuoso Django Reinhardt, who influenced Nelson's playing.

Track listing

Side one
"Mona Lisa" (Jay Livingston, Ray Evans) (2:28)
"Exactly Like You" (Dorothy Fields, Jimmy McHugh) (2:22)
"Who's Sorry Now?" (Bert Kalmar, Harry Ruby, Ted Snyder) (2:58)
"I'm Confessin' (That I Love You)" (Al Neiburg, Doc Daugherty, Ellis Reynolds) (3:30)
"Won't You Ride in My Little Red Wagon" (Rex Griffin) (2:28)

Side two
"Over the Rainbow" (E.Y. Harburg, Harold Arlen) (3:33)
"In My Mother's Eyes" (Willie Nelson) (3:06)
"I'm Gonna Sit Right Down and Write Myself a Letter" (Fred E. Ahlert, Joe Young) (2:58)
"It Wouldn't Be the Same (Without You)" (Fred Rose, Jimmy Wakely) (2:54)
"Twinkle, Twinkle Little Star" (Traditional; arranged by Willie Nelson) (2:10)

Personnel
Willie Nelson - guitar, vocals
Freddy Powers - guitar, vocals
 Paul Buskirk - tenor guitar, mandolin
Johnny Gimble - fiddle
Bob Moore - bass guitar
 Dean Reynolds - upright bass
Technical
Bert Frilot - engineer
Norman Seeff - photography

Charts

Weekly charts

Year-end charts

References

1981 albums
Willie Nelson albums
Columbia Records albums
Covers albums
Traditional pop albums